There are at least 65 named mountains in Jefferson County, Montana.
 Alta Mountain, el. 
 Bald Mountain, el. 
 Bear Mountain, el. 
 Big Mountain, el. 
 Black Butte, el. 
 Black Sheep Mountain, el. 
 Blueball Mountain, el. 
 Bonan Hill, el. 
 Bullock Hill, el. 
 Burnt Mountain, el. 
 Capital Hill, el. 
 Casey Peak, el. 
 Cave Mountain, el. 
 Corral Mountain, el. 
 Crow Peak, el. 
 Doherty Mountain, el. 
 Dolomite Knob, el. 
 Dry Mountain, el. 
 Dunn Peak, el. 
 Emerson Peak, el. 
 Fletcher Mountain, el. 
 Fox Mountain, el. 
 Goldflint Mountain, el. 
 Goodwin Mountain, el. 
 Gregory Mountain, el. 
 Haystack Mountain, el. 
 High Peak, el. 
 Iron Mountain, el. 
 Jack Mountain, el. 
 Jack Mountain, el. 
 Lava Mountain, el. 
 Lava Mountain, el. 
 Legget Hill, el. 
 Little Butte, el. 
 McClusky Mountain, el. 
 Mount Pisgah, el. 
 Mount Thompson, el. 
 Pipestone Rock, el. 
 Pole Mountain, el. 
 Pulpit Rock, el. 
 Rampart Mountain, el. 
 Ratio Mountain, el. 
 Red Hill, el. 
 Ringing Rocks, el. 
 Rocker Peak, el. 
 Ryan Mountain, el. 
 Saturday Night Hill, el. 
 Sheep Mountain, el. 
 Sheepshead Mountain, el. 
 Shingle Butte, el. 
 Skihi Peak, el. 
 Spire Rock, el. 
 Spruce Hills, el. 
 Strawberry Butte, el. 
 Sugar-loaf Mountain, el. 
 Sullivan Mountain, el. 
 Three Brothers, el. 
 Thunderbolt Mountain, el. 
 Toll Mountain, el. 
 Valparaiso Mountain, el. 
 Whitetail Peak, el. 
 Windy Butte, el. 
 Windy Point, el. 
 Wolf Mountain, el.

See also
 List of mountains in Montana
 List of mountain ranges in Montana

Notes

Landforms of Jefferson County, Montana
Jefferson